Lycée Notre Dame de Sion Istanbul is a French private high school located in the Harbiye, Şişli neighbourhood of Istanbul, Turkey. It was founded in 1856.

The high school was established in the Ottoman Empire as a missionary school for girls only. It was later transformed into a co-educational status. The Medium of instruction from preparatory class through twelfth grade is in the French and Turkish language, and takes four years after a preparatory class of one school year.

History
A group of eleven French nuns traveled to Istanbul arriving on October 7, 1856. They took over the administration of Maison du Saint-Esprit, a boarding school in the Pangaltı neighborhood, which was named after the 1846-built Cathedral of the Holy Spirit next to it, and was run by the Daughters of Charity of Saint Vincent de Paul, a society of apostolic life for women within the Catholic Church. The official opening of the French boarding school under the name Lycée Notre Dame de Sion took place on November 27 of the same year. It became the first ever girls' school in Turkey. Inıtially a boarding school for Christian girls, it shortly after attracted Jewish pupils. From 1863 on, Muslim girls attended the school following the interest of the notable families in the Empire and the approval of the Ottoman Sultan.

The school closed down during World War I when the French nuns left the country as a result of their country being at war with Turkey.

In 1919, the school reopened. With the foundation of the Turkish Republic in 1923, the school was subordinated to the Ministry of National Education, and Turkish administrators and teachers joined the school staff. It began also to serve as a day school. The primary school section was closed in 1971, and the boarding school in 1972. From 1989 on, the head of the school administration was handed over to a secular rector while the nuns remained serving in the school as well. After a 140-year long tradition of girls only school, it went co-educational, accepting boys with the 1996–97 school year.

Cultural projects
An international piano contest was organized by the school in 2013.

A chamber music concert was performed in the school in 2014 in commemoration of harpist Fatma Ceren Necipoğlu, who died at the Air France Flight 447 accident in 2009.

In 2015, the art gallery of the school hosted an exhibition titled "Osmanlı'dan Cumhuriyet'e Kadınlar" (literally:Women from the Ottoman Empire to the Turkish Republic) showing Christian, Jewish and Muslim women mainly on postcards from 1880 to 1930.

Notable alumni
 Three adoptive children of Mustafa Kemal Atatürk, including Afet İnan (1908–1985) ), were educated in Lycée Notre Dame de Sion.  
 Ayla Algan (born 1937), film/stage actress and singer,
 Adile Ayda (1912–1992), diplomat
 Oya Baydar (born 1940), sociologist and writer
 Aliye Berger (1903–1974), artist, engraver and painter,
 Selina Özuzun Doğan (born 1977), lawyer and politician,
 Balçiçek İlter (born 1973), journalist and television presenter
 Afet İnan (1908–1985), historian
 Güzin Sayar (1922-2006), journalist and agony aunt known as 'Güzin Abla'
 Nazlı Ilıcak (born 1944), journalist and writer,
 Suzan Kahramaner (1913–2006), mathematician, one of the first Turkish female mathematicians with PhD
 Füreya Koral (1910–1997), ceramist
 Matild Manukyan (c. 1916-17–2001), businesswoman
 Bedia Muvahhit (1897–1994), stage and movie actress,
 Türkan Rado (1915–2007), first ever Turkish female professor of jurisprudence 
 Pınar Selek (born 1971), sociologist, writer and feminist
 Princess Fahrelnissa Zeid (1901–1991), painter,

Fiction
 Feride, novel character

See also
 Education in the Ottoman Empire

References

External links

1856 establishments in the Ottoman Empire
Education in the Ottoman Empire
Educational institutions established in 1856
Catholic secondary schools in Europe
Girls' schools in Turkey
Private schools in Turkey
Catholic Church in the Ottoman Empire
France–Ottoman Empire relations
France–Turkey relations
High schools in Istanbul
Şişli